Gudleppa Hallikeri (1906–1972) was an Indian freedom fighter who is a native of Hosaritti in Haveri district of Karnataka state. He started a residential school Gandhi Grameena Gurukul in Hosaritti.

Hallikeri worked with many other freedom fighters such as Mahatma Gandhi, Mailara Mahadevappa and Sanikoppa, using peace protests and non-violence. There is a larger than life iron wrought statue of Hallikeri in his final hometown, Hubli.

Hallikeri actively worked with Aluru Venkata Rao in the unification of Karnataka.

Karnatak Lingayat Education Society's Gudleppa Hallikeri Arts, Science & Commerce College in Haveri, is one of the colleges in North Karnataka, named after him.

References

External links 
 

1906 births
1972 deaths
People from Haveri district
Kannada people
Indian independence activists from Karnataka